Michael Fedele (born March 30, 1955 in Minturno, Italy) is an Italian-American politician. A member of the Republican Party, he served as the 107th Lieutenant Governor of Connecticut from 2007 to 2011.

Following the decision on November 9, 2009, by incumbent Governor M. Jodi Rell not to seek re-election, Fedele announced his candidacy to seek the office of governor in the 2010 Connecticut gubernatorial election. He was a candidate in the party's primary contest, but narrowly lost the nomination on August 10 to former United States Ambassador to Ireland Tom Foley. Fedele ran for Mayor of Stamford in 2013. He lost the election to David Martin.

Career
Fedele is the founder and CEO of Stamford-based Pinnacle Group, a nationwide IT firm. Fedele started his public service as a member of Stamford's Board of Representatives, serving the city's 13th District from 1987–1991. Fedele represented Stamford's 147th District in the Connecticut House of Representatives from 1992 until 2002. He ran for the Connecticut Senate that year, losing to Democrat Andrew J. McDonald. On January 3, 2007, Fedele was sworn in as Connecticut's 107th Lieutenant Governor, serving with Governor Rell.

In 2009, Fedele received the Prescott Bush Award, the highest honor that the Connecticut Republican Party awards to a member of the Party. Boy's Town of Italy also honored Fedele with their 2009 Humanitarian of the Year Award.

Education
Fedele attended Fairfield University and Norwalk State Technical College.

Personal
Fedele is a native of Minturno, Italy.  He has raised three children in his hometown of Stamford with his wife Carol.

References

External links
Fedele 2010 for Governor of Connecticut, Official Website

|-

1955 births
Fairfield University alumni
Italian emigrants to the United States
Lieutenant Governors of Connecticut
Living people
Republican Party members of the Connecticut House of Representatives
People from the Province of Latina
Politicians from Stamford, Connecticut
American people of Italian descent